Vidot is a surname. Notable people with the surname include:

Daniel Vidot (born 1990), Australian wrestler and rugby league player
Elvina Vidot (born 1993), French Paralympic athlete 
José María de Urquinaona y Vidot (1814–1883), Spanish Roman Catholic bishop
Julien Vidot (born 1982), French racing driver